Thomas Van Swearingen (May 5, 1784 – August 19, 1822) was a U.S. Representative from Virginia.

Biography
Born near Shepherdstown, Virginia (now West Virginia), Van Swearingen attended the common schools.
He served as member of the State House of Delegates 1814–1816.

Van Swearingen was elected to the Sixteenth and Seventeenth Congresses and served from March 4, 1819, until his death in Shepherdstown, Virginia, August 19, 1822.
He was interred in Elmwood Cemetery.

He was the third cousin of U.S Representative Henry D. Swearingen of Ohio.

Electoral history

1819; Van Swearingen was elected to the U.S. House of Representatives with 55.71% of the vote, defeating fellow Federalist Edward Colston.
1821; Van Swearingen was re-elected with 83.21% of the vote, defeating Independent Robert Bailey.

See also
List of United States Congress members who died in office (1790–1899)

Sources

External links

1784 births
1822 deaths
Members of the Virginia House of Delegates
People from Shepherdstown, West Virginia
Federalist Party members of the United States House of Representatives from Virginia
19th-century American politicians